William Alexander Fraser Agnew, known as Fraser Agnew, is a politician in Northern Ireland who was a Member of the Legislative Assembly (MLA) for Belfast North from 1998 to 2003.

After growing up in Ballyclare, Agnew studied at the University of Ulster, Jordanstown, Belfast Technical College and the College of Business Studies.  He worked as a writer and architectural draughtsperson and was elected to Newtownabbey Borough Council as an Ulster Unionist Party (UUP) representative in 1980.  Agnew was also elected to the Northern Ireland Assembly, 1982.

In 1990, Agnew served as the Mayor of Newtownabbey.  In the early 1990s, he left the UUP and was later re-elected as an independent Unionist. In 1996, standing for the 'Independent Templeton' ticket, he was an unsuccessful candidate in the Northern Ireland Forum election in South Antrim.
He was elected as an independent in the 1998 Northern Ireland Assembly election, when he formed the United Unionist Coalition (UUC) with other anti-Good Friday Agreement unionists.

All three members of the UUC, including Agnew, lost their seats at the 2003 Assembly election. He held his council seat for the UUC in 2005. In March 2007, he was awarded the Freedom of the Borough of Newtownabbey. In January 2011, he rejoined the UUP. Tom Elliot, leader of the UUP had this to say regarding his decision: "I strongly believe that voters across the province will return, like Fraser, to their natural Ulster Unionist home and I am looking forward to making sure that the UUP becomes the party of choice for all shades of progressive Unionist opinion."

References

Sources
The Northern Ireland Assembly

20th-century births
Year of birth missing (living people)
Living people
People from Ballyclare
Members of Newtownabbey Borough Council
Mayors of Newtownabbey
Northern Ireland MPAs 1982–1986
Northern Ireland MLAs 1998–2003
Independent members of the Northern Ireland Assembly
Ulster Unionist Party councillors